Bhind is a city in the Indian state of Madhya Pradesh. It is the headquarters of the Bhind district.

Demographics
As of 2011 Indian Census, Bhind had a total population of 197,585, of which 105,352 were males and 92,233 were females. Population within the age group of 0 to 6 years was 25,358. The total number of literates in Bhind was 142,923, which constituted 72.3% of the population with male literacy of 77.9% and female literacy of 65.9%. The effective literacy rate of 7+ population of Bhind was 83.0%, of which male literacy rate was 89.6% and female literacy rate was 75.4%. The Scheduled Castes and Scheduled Tribes population was 39,267 and 1,832 respectively. Bhind had 33592 households in 2011.

 India census, Bhind had a population of 153,768. Males constitute 54% of the population.

References

 
Cities and towns in Bhind district
Cities in Madhya Pradesh